1/4 or  or  or in decimal from 0.25 may refer to:

 The calendar date January 4, in month-day format
 The calendar date 1 April in day-month format
 1st Battalion, 4th Marines, an infantry battalion in the United States Marine Corps
 A fraction of one fourth, one quarter, 25% or 0.25; see Quarter (disambiguation)

See also
Fourth (disambiguation)
Number Forms, a Unicode block containing characters that have specific meaning as numbers
25 (disambiguation)